The Walking in Between is the fifth full-length studio album released by Ben Rector, an American singer/songwriter from Oklahoma and now based in Nashville, Tennessee. The album was released on August 20, 2013. It was partly produced by Jamie Kenney and Charlie Peacock and partially self-produced, The Walking in Between is the first release on Rector's own label, Aptly Named Recordings. The album debuted at No. 16 on the Billboard 200 chart.

Track listing 
 "Ordinary Love"
 "When I'm With You"
 "Beautiful"
 "Making Money"
 "I Like You"
 "Sailboat"
 "Follow You"
 "If You Can Hear Me"
 "Wildfire"
 "Forever Like That"
 "Life Keeps Moving On"
 "Thank God for the Summertime"
 "Forever Like That" (Acoustic)

Reception

Critical
The album received mostly positive feedback overall from localized and national publications. A Huffington Post writer regarded the album as a "smash".
Additionally, according to a review from Atlanta Music Guide, the album "delivers a pleasant listening experience." The reviewer said simple arrangements, clever lyrics, and a crystalline quality of voice were the strong points of the album.

Commercial
The album debuted at No. 16 on the Billboard 200, and No. 2 on the Folk Albums chart, with 21,000 copies sold in its first week. It has sold 53,000 copies in the United States as of August 2015.

Charts

References

2013 albums
Ben Rector albums
Self-released albums